Potamogeton rutilus is a species of flowering plant belonging to the family Potamogetonaceae.

Its native range is Europe to Siberia and Mongolia.

References

rutilus